The women's 60 metres at the 2022 World Athletics Indoor Championships took place on 18 March 2022.

Results

Heats
Qualification: First 3 in each heat (Q) and the next 6 fastest (q) advance to the Semi-Finals

The heats were started at 10:15.

Semifinals
Qualification: First 2 in each heat (Q) and the next 2 fastest (q) advance to the Final

The heats were started at 18:05.

Final
The final was started at 20:52.

References

60 metres
60 metres at the World Athletics Indoor Championships